The Caldas da Rainha Ladies Open is a tournament for professional female tennis players. The event is classified as a $60,000+H ITF Women's Circuit tournament and has been held on outdoor hardcourts in Caldas da Rainha, Portugal, since 2019.

Past finals

Singles

Doubles

External links
 ITF search

ITF Women's World Tennis Tour
Recurring sporting events established in 2019
Hard court tennis tournaments
Tennis tournaments in Portugal
2019 establishments in Portugal